Stapelbäddsparken is a skateboarding park in Malmö, Sweden. It was designed by Stefan Hauser.

Parks in Malmö
Skateparks in Sweden